Cumbayá Fútbol Club is an Ecuadorian professional football club from the city of Cumbayá. Founded on 31 May 1970 as Club Deportivo Los Loros, they play in the Serie A.

History
Founded on 31 May 1970 as Club Deportivo Los Loros in Quito, the club started to play in the Segunda Categoría de Pichincha in 2013. They reached the Segunda Categoría in 2015, but were knocked out in the first stage.

In 2017, after a change of administration, the club was moved to the city of Cumbayá and renamed Cumbayá Fútbol Club. In the following three seasons, the club competed in the Segunda Categoría before reaching the finals in 2020, where they achieved promotion to the Serie B but lost to Guayaquil Sport.

In their first-ever season in the second division, Cumbayá achieved promotion to the Serie A on 23 September 2021, being subsequently declared champions with three rounds to go. On 12 October, manager Raúl Duarte announced his departure from the club.

Achievements
Serie B
Winner (1): 2021

Segunda Categoría
Runner-up (1): 2020

Players

Current squad

References

External links
 

Football clubs in Ecuador
Association football clubs established in 1970
1970 establishments in Ecuador